Michael Ryan (born 1944) is a former television broadcaster on Raidió Teilifís Éireann (RTÉ). He used to present Nationwide, which is broadcast on RTÉ One every Monday, Wednesday and Friday evening. Mary Kennedy joined him as co-presenter in later years.

He lived in Marino, Dublin as a child. He has two sons, Dylan and Colin Ryan, and a daughter, Lisa. His first wife and the mother of his children, Anne Christine Ryan (née Kearney), died in a car accident in 1995 while travelling home from Waterford, where she ran a successful PR company. Ryan married his second wife Liz in 2010. He is considered "popular" in Ireland. He has been based in Wexford for more than 30 years.

He retired from his career in RTÉ in 2011.

References

External links
 Nationwide at RTÉ.ie

Living people
The Herald (Ireland) people
Irish Independent people
RTÉ television presenters
RTÉ newsreaders and journalists
1944 births
Place of birth missing (living people)